The following is a list of indoor arenas which are currently the home of a basketball team. They are ordered by capacity, which is the maximum number of spectators the arena can accommodate for basketball. It does not contain arenas which have hosted individual games in a basketball tournament if the venue currently has no permanent basketball tenant, but does include arenas that are regular hosts of basketball tournaments.

See also

List of National Basketball Association arenas
List of NCAA Men's Division I Basketball Tournament venues
List of National Basketball League (Australia) venues
List of indoor arenas by capacity
List of ice hockey arenas by capacity

References

Basketball arenas by capacity
 
Arenas by capacity